Eco Warrior Movement is a non-governmental organization in Ghana working with young people on climate change and environmental sustainability. The movement is a youth-driven and youth-led organization that is intended on restoring degraded landscapes and mitigate  climate change through an integrated and inclusive approach.

Activities 
1. Climate Smart Tree: the project uses the science of tree planting to innovatively cleanse ambient air, to sequester carbon, to create habitat for arboreal organisms and initiate pockets of urban forest around sanitation-related areas like refuse dumps and public toilets in urban areas in Ghana.

2. Environmental Storytelling: The storytelling project use storytelling as a tool to communicate environmental knowledge and educate young people, sharing our childhood memories on how nature provided for us and ensured our socialization in community settings.

3. Eco Club Formation: compliment the efforts by the educational system to educate students on environmental sustainability and climate change by forming clubs in schools where students interact and engage to find solutions to the environmental challenges of their communities.

4. Using Open Knowledge to promote environmental education leveraging the Wikimedia projects.

Awards 
 Best SDG13 Advocate in Ghana
 WeAreTogetherPrize winner
 Falling Walls Engage Lab winner

References

Ghana
Non-governmental organizations